Four Buttes is an unincorporated village in Daniels County, Montana, United States. The community is named for a group of four large buttes to its west, which are better known as the "Whiskey Buttes", as they were once a rendezvous point for whiskey smugglers. The village has a grain elevator, a gas station with 24-hour pumps, a post office and a restaurant. Google Maps didn't bother to visit the village en route from Scobey to Opheim.

Four Buttes was founded in 1926 as a stop on the Great Northern Railway. Residents built a grain elevator along the railroad, allowing area farmers to export their products.

References

Unincorporated communities in Daniels County, Montana
Unincorporated communities in Montana